Aspidosiphonidae is a family of peanut worms. It is the only family in the monotypic order Aspidosiphonida, which is in the class Phascolosomatidea.

Description 
The family Aspidosiphonidae is characterized by an oval disk with short tentacles, arranged in a crescent-shape made of an enclosed nuchal organ. It has a canal of sacs in the coelom, lying in a continuous band. The anal and caudal shield (at the anterior end) are both made up, not of chitin, but of a horny protein. It is of note that most, but not all, of the Aspidosiphonidae family has a caudal shield. The family also has two nephridia.

Species

Aspidosiphon
 Aspidosiphon albus Murina, 1967
 Aspidosiphon coyi de Quatrefages, 1865
 Aspidosiphon elegans (Chamisso and Eysenhardt, 1821)
 Aspidosiphon exiguus Edmonds 1974
 Aspidosiphon fischeri Broeke, A. ten, 1925
 Aspidosiphon gosnoldi Cutler, E., 1981
 Aspidosiphon gracilis (Baird, 1868)
 Aspidosiphon laevis de Quatrefages, 1865
 Aspidosiphon mexicanus Murina, 1967
 Aspidosiphon misakiensis Ikeda 1904
 Aspidosiphon muelleri Diesing 1851
 Aspidosiphon parvulus Gerould, 1913
 Aspidosiphon planoscutatus Murina, 1968
 Aspidosiphon spiralis Sluiter, 1902
 Aspidosiphon steenstrupii Diesing, 1859
 Aspidosiphon tenuis Sluiter, 1886
 Aspidosiphon thomassini Cutler and Cutler, 1979
 Aspidosiphon venabulum Selenka & Bulow, 1883
 Aspidosiphon zinni Cutler, 1969

Cloeosiphon
 Cloeosiphon aspergillus (de Quatrefages, 1865)

Lithacrosiphon
 Lithacrosiphon cristatus (Sluiter, 1902)
 Lithacrosiphon maldivensis Shipley 1902

References

External links

 Sipuncula LifeDesk: Aspidosiphonidae

Sipunculans